Syed Pīr Bādshāh, was a late medieval Bengali Sufi saint and author of Taraf. He is best known for writing Ganj-e-Taraz in the  Persian language.

Early life and family
Syed Pir Badshah was born in Pail Haveli to a Bengali Muslim family known as the Syeds of Taraf. His lineage is as follows: Syed Pir Badshah, son of Syed Shah Nuri, son of Syed Musa, son of Shah Khandakar, son of Syed Ilyas Quddus Qutb-ul-Awliya, son of Syed Shah Israil, son of Syed Khudawand, son of Syed Musafir, son of Syed Sirajuddin, who was the son of Syed Nasiruddin. His father, Syed Shah Nuri, gained permission from the Delhi emperor to separate from Taraf and form the Nurul Hasan Nagar pargana (named after himself). The family then settled in Pail Haveli from then onwards.

Career and later life
Badshah became prominent after publishing his Persian book "Ganj-e-Taraz". He had a son who was known as Shah Zindi.

Death
He died in Pail Haveli in present-day Habiganj Sadar, where a dargah was built around his grave. There are two mosques adjacent to the dargah as well as a pond which was founded by a local faqir. This dargah also hosts the graves of his descendant Syed Nazirul Haq, Syed Abdul Haq and Syed Jahidul Haq. In 1989, the walls and dome of the dargah became quite damaged and so a refurbishment took place.

References

People from Habiganj Sadar Upazila
Bengali writers
Medieval Persian-language writers
Indian male writers
Indian Muslims
Year of birth unknown
Year of death unknown